Southeastern Airlines was a regional airline that was acquired by Atlantic Southeast Airlines, a Delta Connection carrier, on April 1, 1983.  It was formed in 1982 by Atlanta entrepreneur Michael J. Brady, who had formerly been head of Eastern Metro Express, a feeder for Eastern Airlines.

History
The airline was originally known as Southeastern Commuter Airlines, but the "Commuter" part was dropped at some point before the merge with ASA. Southeastern served many cities in the southeast, mostly in the state of Georgia, using Atlanta as a hub.

References

Defunct regional airlines of the United States
Defunct companies based in Georgia (U.S. state)
Airlines established in 1982
1982 establishments in Georgia (U.S. state)
Defunct airlines of the United States